is a passenger railway station located in the city of Kinokawa, Wakayama Prefecture, Japan, operated by the private railway company Wakayama Electric Railway.

Lines
Nishiyamaguchi Station is served by the Kishigawa Line, and is located 12.1 kilometers from the terminus of the line at Wakayama Station.

Station layout
The station consists of one side platform. The station building was demolished in 1996 and there is now only a weather shelter on the platform. The station is unattended.

Adjacent stations

History
Nishiyamaguchi Station opened on August 18, 1933.

Passenger statistics

Surrounding Area
Nagayama housing complex

See also
List of railway stations in Japan

References

External links

 Nishiyamaguchi Station timetable

Railway stations in Japan opened in 1933
Railway stations in Wakayama Prefecture
Kinokawa, Wakayama